Kosacha (Bulgarian: Косача, also transliterated Kosača) is a village in western Bulgaria. Its located in Oblast Pernik, Obshtina Kovachevci.

Geography 
The village of Kosacha is located in a mountainous region, 16 km southwest of Pernik and 41 km southwest of Sofia.

The village is a conglomeration of neighborhoods scattered over hills and valleys. The neighborhoods are Tyutyundzhiyska, Polyana, Domishlyarska - there is the house of Georgi Parvanov's mother, Evreyska (Jewish), Velichkova - there is his father's house, Eleninska / grandmother Elena hid Levski in the church, wife of grandfather Pene - a merchant in Constantinople. Picked up by a priest from the village of Ruzhdavitsa /, Bradarska mahala, Kyurkchiyska mahala / there are remains of a fortress /, Gruyova mahala, Stoykovi, Todorovi, Kompirovi, Mialovi / Mihailovi /, Gypsy / by nickname /, Kovachevska mahala. The road distance from Tyutyundzhiya to Arbanashki rid is more than 6 km.

History 
The village was first mentioned in the Ottoman archives in 1573.

The ancient town of Buieridava was located near the village and the Lobosh dam (Pchelina). It was founded approx. 5th century BC from the Thracian tribe Ilei.

Name 

The name derives from the Bulgarian word Kosach, which means Mower.

Landmarks 
There is an alphabet (Cyrillic) containing a list notable Kosachi (Mowers)

Notable people 

 Georgi Ananiev (1950 - 2021), former Minister of Defense
 Pavle (Pavel) Mladenov, Bulgarian revolutionary from IMRO
Petǎr Milev (1879 - 1908), Bulgarian revolutionary
Georgi Konstantinov, Bulgarian revolutionary from IMRO
Georgi Solunski (1939 - ), Bulgarian actor, macedonist
Marko Lazarov (1867 - 1915), Bulgarian revolutionary from IMRO
Stanimir Aleksov, Macedonian-Adrianopolitan volunteer
Georgi Parvanov (1957 - ), former Bulgarian president

References 

 svetimesta.com
 grao.bg
 strumski.com
 strumski.com
 archives.government.bg

Villages in Pernik Province